Kurt Arvin Larson (born February 25, 1966) is a former American football linebacker in the National Football League (NFL). He played for the Indianapolis Colts (1989–1990) and the Green Bay Packers (1991). He played at the collegiate level at Michigan State University.

See also
List of Green Bay Packers players

References

1966 births
Living people
Sportspeople from Waukesha, Wisconsin
Players of American football from Wisconsin
American football linebackers
Michigan State Spartans football players
Indianapolis Colts players
Green Bay Packers players